Spiridens muelleri is a species of moss found on Lord Howe Island. It is the only member of the genus Spiridens known to occur in Australia.

References

Endemic flora of Lord Howe Island
Bryopsida
Taxa named by Georg Ernst Ludwig Hampe
Plants described in 1874